Mohammad Taha can refer to:

 Mohammad Taha (cricketer) (born 2000), Pakistani cricketer
 Mohammad Taha (Hamas), member of Hamas
 Mohammed Taha Mohammed Ahmed (1965-2006), Sudanese journalist
 Muhammad Taha al-Huwayzi (1899–1968), Iranian-Iraqi poet and teacher